Jae-Hoon Ha (born October 29, 1990) is a South Korean professional baseball pitcher for the SSG Landers of the KBO. He was formerly an outfielder for the Tokushima Indigo Socks of Shikoku Island League Plus but converted to pitching full-time when he joined the KBO.

Career
Ha played in Minor League Baseball for the Chicago Cubs organization as an outfielder from 2009 through 2015. He was named to appear in the 2012 All-Star Futures Game, and in a plate appearance against Major League Baseball pitcher Gerrit Cole he hit a home run. Ha signed with the Swallows before the 2016 season.

Prior to the 2019 KBO season, Ha signed with the SK Wyverns. Ha took on the role of closer for the Wyverns in the 2019 season and saved a league-leading 36 games.

References

External links

1990 births
Baseball pitchers
Boise Hawks players
Daytona Cubs players
Eugene Emeralds players
Iowa Cubs players
Living people
Nippon Professional Baseball outfielders
Peoria Chiefs players
SSG Landers players
South Korean expatriate baseball players in Japan
South Korean expatriate baseball players in the United States
Tennessee Smokies players
Tigres de Aragua players
South Korean expatriate baseball players in Venezuela
Tokyo Yakult Swallows players
People from Jinju
Sportspeople from South Gyeongsang Province
South Korean expatriate baseball players in Australia